The 12th Miss Chinese International Pageant, Miss Chinese International Pageant 2000 was held on February 6, 2000 in Las Vegas. For the first time ever, the pageant moved out of Hong Kong, and was held at Caesars Palace. Miss Chinese International 1999 Michelle Ye of New York, USA crowned Sonija Kwok of Hong Kong as the new winner. The next time Hong Kong wins the pageant would be Grace Chan in 2014.

Pageant information
The theme to this year's pageant is "The Arrival of the Dragon, The Beauty Pageant of the Millenium" 「龍騰盛世  千禧競艶」.  The Masters of Ceremonies were Eric Tsang, Jerry Lamb, as well as Miss Chinese International 1999 Michelle Ye and second runner-up Anne Heung.  Special performing guest was cantopop singer Aaron Kwok.

Results

Special awards
Miss Friendship: Jessie Cheng 成潔 (Melbourne)
Miss Internet Popularity: Sonjia Kwok 郭羨妮 (Hong Kong)
Miss Vegas Gorgeous: Sonjia Kwok 郭羨妮 (Hong Kong)

Contestant list

Crossovers
Contestants who previously competed or will be competing at other international beauty pageants:

Miss Universe
 2000: : Sonija Kwok
 2004: Sydney, : Alina Zhang (representing )

Contestant notes
-Sonija Kwok went on to Cyprus to compete in the Miss Universe 2000 pageant. She was unplaced, but placed in the top 10 Miss Photogenic online polls. As of 2010, Kwok is also the last representative of Hong Kong to compete in Miss Universe.

-Alina Zhang later became Miss Universe China 2004 and went on to Ecuador to compete in the Miss Universe 2004 pageant. However, she was unplaced. Zhang is the third representative of the mainland China to compete in Miss Universe.

External links
 Johnny's Pageant Page - Miss Chinese International Pageant 2000

TVB
2000 beauty pageants
2000 in the United States
Beauty pageants in the United States
2000 in Nevada
Miss Chinese International Pageants
Caesars Palace